The Westminster School of Art was an art school in Westminster, London.

History
The Westminster School of Art was located at 18 Tufton Street, Deans Yard, Westminster, and was part of the old Royal Architectural Museum.
H. M. Bateman described it in 1903 as:
"... arranged on four floors with galleries running round a big square courtyard, the whole being covered over with a big glass roof.  Off the galleries were the various rooms which made up the school, the galleries themselves being filled with specimens of architecture which gave the whole place the air of a museum, which of course it was."

In 1904 the art school moved and merged with the Westminster Technical Institute, in a two-story building on Westminster's Vincent Square, established by the philanthropy of Angela Burdett-Coutts, 1st Baroness Burdett-Coutts in 1893.

People associated with the School

Academics and teachers
 Adrian Allinson, art teacher (c. 1947)
 Walter Bayes
 Professor Frederick Brown, headmaster (1877–1892)
 Mark Gertler
 Harold Gilman
 Nina Hamnett, art teacher (1917–1918)
 Richard Arthur Ledward
 Bernard Meninsky 
 Mervyn Peake 
 Eric Schilsky
 Walter Sickert
 Hilary Stratton, Sculpture (1931–39)
 Christopher J. Yorath, lecturing engineer (1908–09)

Alumni

 Clare Atwood
 Mary Audsley
 J M Balliol Salmon
 Harry Barr
 H. M. Bateman
 Aubrey Beardsley
 Jean Bellette
 Robert Polhill Bevan
 David Bomberg 
 Wendela Boreel
 Denise Broadley
 Theo Brown
 Irene Mary Browne
 Stella Bowen 
 Alfred Brumwell Thomas
 Henry Charles Brewer
 Emily Carr
 Frances Crawshaw 
 John Craxton 
 Ruth Doggett
 Florence Engelbach
 Nora England
 Jeffery Farnol, author
 Daphne Fedarb
 Elizabeth Bertha Fraser
 Diana Gardner
 James Gardner, designer (c. 1923)
 Margaret Geddes
 Eric Gill, stonemasonry student (c. 1901)
 Sylvia Gosse
 Duncan Grant
 Barbara Greg
 Richard Hamilton
 Weaver Hawkins
 Paul Haefliger
 Evie Hone
 Mainie Jellett
 David Jones 
 John Luke
 Dugald Sutherland MacColl
 Rose Mead
 John Mennie
 Elizabeth Polunin
 Norman Mills Price
 Alfred William Rich 
 Michael Sherard, fashion designer
 Marjorie Sherlock
 Sam Smith, toy-maker
 Barbara Austin Taylor 
 Robert Tollast
 Christopher Tunnard, landscape architect (1932)
 Dame Ethel Walker
 John Millar Watt
 Clifford Webb
 Victor Winding

References 
 Anderson, Anthony, The Man who was H. M. Bateman, Webb & Bower (Exeter, England, 1982) 
 The Art of War — Artists
 Fine Art — Richard Hamilton
 Walton, Allan, 1891–1948, Director, Glasgow School of Art, Scotland
 Liss Fine Art Portfolio — Clifford Webb

References 

Art schools in London
History of the City of Westminster